American Rights at Work (ARAW) was a U.S. self-described nonpartisan, nonprofit organization that advocates for workers and their right to form unions without interference.

ARAW received funding from unions affiliated with both the AFL-CIO and the Change to Win coalition, but its board of directors and day-to-day activities are not controlled by either labor group.

American Rights at Work merged with Jobs With Justice in 2012.

Leadership 

The chair of the organization's board, David Bonior, took a leave of absence in December 2006 to chair the presidential election campaign of former U.S. Senator John Edwards. Other board members include Julian Bond and Bradley Whitford.  

The executive director of ARAW is Kimberly Freeman Brown. The founding executive director was Mary Beth Maxwell.

See also
Labor movement
Labor history of the United States

Notes

References
"American Rights At Work: Labor laws not strong enough." Workers Independent News. July 7, 2005.
Castillo, Juan. "Workers at Labor Forum Recount Tales of Abuse by Their Employers." Austin American-Statesman. October 19, 2005.
"Democracy at Comcast, Free Choices at Work - Making the Case for the Employee Free Choice Act." Center for American Progress.
Gaffney, Mark. "American Laws Violate Workers' Rights." Detroit News. December 16, 2005.
Gallagher, John. "Laboring After Congress; Bonior Builds Solidarity Stumping for Union Cause." Detroit Free Press. April 10, 2004.
Greenhouse, Steven. "Labor, Under the Gun, Meets to Plot Strategy." New York Times. February 25, 2003.
"Human Rights at Work." The Nation. December 26, 2005.
Knowles, Francine. "Report Says Deck Stacked Against Union Organization." Chicago Sun Times. December 7, 2005.
Landrum Jr., Jonathan. "American Rights at Work to Investigate Abuses at Workplace." Associated Press. October 14, 2005.
Lester, Will. "AFL-CIO Leaders Recruit Groups to Get Out Word About Workers' Plight." Associated Press. October 25, 2005.
Pickler, Nedra. "Edwards Taps Bonior to Lead Future Presidential Campaign." Associated Press. December 5, 2006.

External links
American Rights at Work website

Workers' rights organizations
National Labor Relations Board
United States labor law
Political advocacy groups in the United States
Organizations established in 2003
Multinational mass media companies